Khalij-e Fars is the lead ship of Project Loghman and an upcoming training ship/destroyer of the Islamic Republic of Iran Navy currently under construction.

Construction
Work on the ship began on September 18, 2012 under the Project Loghman, after being confirmed by Ayatollah Ali Khamenei.

Description

See also

 List of military equipment manufactured in Iran

References

External links
Profile at GlobalSecurity.org

Destroyers of the Islamic Republic of Iran Navy
Ships built at Iranian Naval Factories
Training ships